Dexter is an unincorporated community in Lane County, Oregon, United States. It is located near Dexter Reservoir, a.k.a. Dexter Lake, a reservoir of the Middle Fork Willamette River along Oregon Route 58.

A post office was established in the locality in 1872 and named "Butte Disappointment", after a local landmark named in 1848. The post office was renamed "Dexter" in 1875, apparently after the "Dexter" brand cook stove owned by the postmaster's family.

Access to Dexter Lake, a popular fishing and boating site, is available at Dexter State Recreation Site. The nearby Dexter Lake Club was used in the filming of the road trip scene in the movie Animal House.

The Lost Valley Educational Center is an intentional community near Dexter.

The Parvin Bridge, a covered bridge near Dexter, was placed on the National Register of Historic Places in 1979. It carries Parvin Road over Lost Creek, which flows by Dexter.

In 2002, despite not having a city government, Dexter residents opened a public library, the Cascades Foothills Library, that as of August 2006 they are hoping to expand into a regional library.

Demographics

References

External links

Parvin Bridge from Lane County, Oregon Web site

Unincorporated communities in Lane County, Oregon
1872 establishments in Oregon
Populated places established in 1872
Unincorporated communities in Oregon
Populated places on the Willamette River